The Copeland "Anti-kickback" Act (codified at ) is a U.S. labor law and act of Congress that supplemented the Davis–Bacon Act of 1931.  It prohibits a federal building contractor or subcontractor from inducing an employee into giving up any part of the compensation that he or she is entitled to under the terms of his or her  employment contract.  The Copeland Act also incorporated provisions of President Hoover's executive order no. 5778,  requiring employers to file weekly compliance reports.

Background
The Copeland Act takes its name from U.S. Senator Royal S. Copeland, its primary sponsor.  Copeland's Senate Subcommittee on Crime found that up to 25% of the federal money paid for labor under prevailing wage rates was actually returned by the wage-earner as a kickback to the employing contractor or subcontractor, or to government officials.  Copeland proposed the bill, S. 3041, with a brief statement in the Senate on April 26, 1934, and it passed without debate in both the Senate and House of Representatives.  It was signed into law by President Franklin D. Roosevelt on June 13, 1934.

Text
The Act is one long sentence as follows:

Operation
The Copeland Act is administered by the U.S. Department of Labor.  The Department of Labor publishes its applicable regulations in the Code of Federal Regulations, Title 29, Part 3.

The Act originally provided for up to $5000 in fines and up to five years of imprisonment for violations.  The Violent Crime Control and Law Enforcement Act of 1994 deleted the amount of the fine, bringing it under the general fine provisions of the federal criminal statutes.

See also
 Anti-Kickback Enforcement Act

References

External links
 The Copeland "Anti-Kickback" Act, U.S. Department of Labor

1934 in law
1934 in the United States
73rd United States Congress
United States federal labor legislation
Bribery